Tupelo is a city in Coal County, Oklahoma, United States. The population was 329 at the 2010 census.

History 
A post office opened at Jeffs, Indian Territory on June 28, 1894.  It moved to the present site of Tupelo on October 25, 1900, and its name changed to Tupelo, Indian Territory on January 13, 1904.  Jeffs took its name from Jefferson D. Perry, first postmaster.  Tupelo was named for Tupelo, Mississippi, which itself was named for the tupelo gum tree.

At the time of their founding, Jeffs, and later Tupelo, were located in Atoka County, a part of the Pushmataha District of the Choctaw Nation.

Geography
Tupelo is located in western Coal County at  (34.603133, -96.420531). State Highway 48 passes through Tupelo, leading south  to Wapanucka and north  to Allen.

Demographics

As of the census of 2000, there were 377 people, 136 households, and 99 families residing in the city. The population density was 939.1 people per square mile (363.9/km). There were 178 housing units at an average density of 443.4 per square mile (171.8/km). The racial makeup of the city was 70.29% White, 0.53% African American, 24.40% Native American, 0.27% from other races, and 4.51% from two or more races. Hispanic or Latino of any race were 2.65% of the population.

There were 136 households, out of which 41.2% had children under the age of 18 living with them, 55.9% were married couples living together, 12.5% had a female householder with no husband present, and 27.2% were non-families. 22.8% of all households were made up of individuals, and 14.0% had someone living alone who was 65 years of age or older. The average household size was 2.77 and the average family size was 3.29.

In the city the population was spread out, with 31.3% under the age of 18, 11.4% from 18 to 24, 24.4% from 25 to 44, 18.8% from 45 to 64, and 14.1% who were 65 years of age or older. The median age was 29 years. For every 100 females, there were 95.3 males. For every 100 females age 18 and over, there were 90.4 males.

The median income for a household in the city was $17,000, and the median income for a family was $19,688. Males had a median income of $21,563 versus $15,000 for females. The per capita income for the city was $8,852. About 29.6% of families and 30.7% of the population were below the poverty line, including 39.7% of those under age 18 and 22.8% of those age 65 or over.

Notable people from Tupelo
Cord McCoy, professional bull rider and contestant on the 16th season, the 18th season, and the 24th season of The Amazing Race.
Rena Hughes, 1981 graduate of Tupelo HIgh School and Eighth Judicial District Court Judge of Clark County, Nevada 2014.
Lloyd Smith, Guitarist for Bob Wills and the Texas Playboys also played for other bands.

References

Cities in Coal County, Oklahoma
Cities in Oklahoma